Legislative elections were held in Romania on 30 November 2008. The Democratic Liberal Party (PDL) won three more seats than PSD in the Chamber of Deputies and the Senate, although the alliance headed by the Social Democratic Party (PSD) won more votes and a fractionally higher vote share. The two parties subsequently formed a governing coalition with Emil Boc of the PDL as Prime Minister.

Electoral system
President Traian Băsescu had wanted to introduce a single-winner two-round electoral system before this election, but a 2007 referendum on the proposal failed due to insufficient turnout. A new electoral system was introduced as a compromise, with the previous party-list proportional representation system changed to a mixed member proportional representation system using sub-county constituencies (colegii electorale). A candidate was declared the winner in any electoral college where they obtained more than 50% of the vote. Seats where no candidate won an outright majority are then allocated using the D'Hondt method. If necessary, the number of seats for each chamber is raised, by giving supplementary seats. An electoral threshold of 5% was applied for each chamber; or winning at least six colleges for the Chamber of Deputies and three colleges for the Senate by more than 50%. There was an additional adjustment for the Chamber of Deputies around the national minorities candidates.

Contenders
The main contenders in the election were the centre-left alliance made up of the Social Democratic Party (PSD) and the Conservative Party (PC); the liberal-conservative Democratic Liberal Party (PDL); and the liberal National Liberal Party (PNL).

Other significant contenders were the ethnic Hungarian party Democratic Alliance of Hungarians in Romania (UDMR/RMDSZ) and the right-wing nationalist Greater Romania Party (PRM), both of whom were represented in the previous Parliament.

Opinion polls 

The first exit-polls, published by INSOMAR after the polls were closed, predicted the results for the Chamber of Deputies as:

PSD+PC - 36.2%;

PDL - 30.3%;

PNL - 20.4%;

UDMR - 6.7%.

And for the Senate:

PSD+PC - 35.9%;

PDL - 31.1%;

PNL - 19.9%;

UDMR - 6.7%.

Results

Compared to the 2004 election, the -led alliance fell back a few percents in the national vote share.

Support for the Democratic Alliance of Hungarians in Romania (UDMR/RMDSZ) was largely unchanged. The  (PRM) obtained 13% of the national vote for the Chamber in 2004, but failed in 2008 to pass the 5% electoral threshold.

Senate

Chamber of Deputies

Aftermath

Government formation

It was expected that a grand coalition of the Social Democrats and the Democratic Liberal Party (PDL) would be formed. Initially the Prime Minister-designate was Theodor Stolojan, the PDL's official candidate. He was designated Prime Minister by the President Traian Băsescu on 11 December 2008, the official decree being issued and printed in the Monitorul Oficial the next day.

On 15 December 2008, four days after his nomination, and one day after the coalition protocol was signed, Stolojan announced that he had resigned from the position of Prime Minister-designate, without giving any reason. The same day, Băsescu signed a decree that nominated the Mayor of Cluj-Napoca and PDL president Emil Boc.

Boc's coalition government with the Social Democrats was approved by parliament in a 324–115 vote and was sworn in on 22 December 2008. Mircea Geoana of the Social Democrats became the new head of the Senate, with Roberta Alma Anastase of the PDL as the new President of the Chamber of Deputies.

By-elections
At the start of the 2008–2012 parliamentary term, only parties that had won seats in the 2008 elections were eligible to contest parliamentary by-elections. However, this changed in 2011, after which all parties were allowed to propose candidates. The change came after repeated contests to the Constitutional Court of Romania of former 2009 presidential candidate Remus Cernea.

Following the nomination of Bogdan Olteanu to the Council of Administration of the National Bank of Romania as Deputy Governor, the first by-election of the parliamentary term took place in Bucharest constituency 1 will be held the first by-election of this legislature. The election was held on 17 January 2010 and was a contest between Radu Stroe of the National Liberal Party (PNL) and Honorius Prigoană, representing the PDL. The Social Democrats decided not to propose a candidate and to support the PNL candidate. Stroe was subsequently elected.

Daniela Popa resigned from the Chamber of Deputies to take office as President of the Insurance Supervising Committee, also stepping down as president of the Conservative Party. The PNL decided not to have its own candidate, but to support the PSD+PC candidate, based on the gentlemen's agreement for the Bucharest by-election. The PSD nominated Conservative Party member and former Romanian Lottery director Liliana Mincă, with the PDL putting forward former TV show host Teo Trandafir, who went on to win.

Following the death of Ioan Timiş, Deputy for Hunedoara County constituency 3, a by-election took place on 28 November 2010. All parties nominated candidates, with former Minister of Labour, Mariana Câmpeanu of the PNL winning.

In January 2011, the representative of the Macedonians in Romania, Liana Dumitrescu, died. As she was a representative of a national minority, her seat had no college. As a result, her seat was left empty.

In April 2011 Victor Surdu died, vacating his seat in the Chamber of Deputies, Neamț County constituency 6. The by-election was held on 21 August 2011 and won by the PDL candidate, Adrian Rădulescu, Secretary of State in the Ministry of Agriculture.

In May 2011, Cătălin Cherecheș was elected Mayor of Baia Mare, automatically vacating her seat in the Chamber of Deputies, Maramureș County constituency 2. The by-election on 21 August saw Florin Tătaru of the Social Liberal Union elected.

On 30 August 2011, Zoltán Pálfi died, vacacting Cluj County constituency 9.

References

Parliamentary elections in Romania
Romania
Legislative
Legislative election
November 2008 events in Europe